Sebastian Sun Anderson (born August 8, 2002) is an American soccer player who plays as a defender for USL Championship club Colorado Springs Switchbacks, on loan from Colorado Rapids.

Club career
Anderson played for Real Colorado's academy from 2012 to 2017. He joined the Colorado Rapids Academy in 2017. On April 3, 2019, Anderson signed a homegrown player contract with the Rapids, becoming the youngest homegrown signing in club history. On April 27, 2019, Anderson made his professional debut for the Rapids in a 1–0 away loss to Atlanta United. Anderson started and played 80 minutes of the match. On July 20, 2019, Anderson scored his first MLS goal in the 6th minute of a 1–2 loss to New York City FC. In the 33rd minute of the match, Anderson was sent off on a straight red card. Anderson was loaned to Colorado Springs Switchbacks FC of the USL Championship on Aug. 23. Anderson made three appearances, all of them starts, for Switchbacks FC. Anderson was on the bench for the Rapids' match against Los Angeles FC on Oct. 6.

On February 21, 2020, Anderson was loaned to Switchbacks FC. Anderson played 90 minutes in Switchbacks FC's 2-1 win over Oklahoma City Energy on March 7. Anderson underwent successful knee surgery to repair an anterior tear of his lateral meniscus on June 10. In March 2021, Anderson re-joined Colorado Springs on loan for the 2021 season.

Anderson was again loaned to the Switchbacks on September 16, 2022.

International career
Anderson has featured for both the United States under-15 national team and United States under-17 national team. In October 2019, he was named to the squad for the 2019 FIFA U-17 World Cup in Brazil.

Career statistics

References

External links
 
 

Living people
2002 births
American soccer players
Soccer players from Sacramento, California
Association football defenders
Colorado Rapids players
Colorado Springs Switchbacks FC players
Major League Soccer players
USL Championship players
United States men's youth international soccer players
Soccer players from Colorado
People from Highlands Ranch, Colorado
Homegrown Players (MLS)
Colorado Rapids 2 players
MLS Next Pro players